Nebdjefare was a pharaoh of the Fourteenth Dynasty of Egypt. He appears to have ruled during the Second Intermediate Period, for between 12 and 24 months, during the 17th centuryBC. Knowledge of his reign comes entirely from the severely damaged Turin King List.

Biography
Nebdjefare is an obscure pharaoh of the Fourteenth Dynasty of Egypt, known only from the Turin King List. He would have ruled the north of Lower Egypt between 12 and 24 months in the early 17th century BC. Scholars have variously placed the beginning of his reign at  1694 BC (Ryholt & Bülow-Jacobsen 1997) and  1672 BC (Gonzalez 1995), a time usually considered part of the Second Intermediate Period or of the very end of the Middle Kingdom. At the time of his reign, the Thirteenth Dynasty would still have been ruling the rest of Egypt from Memphis.
 
Knowledge of his reign comes from the Turin King List, a badly damaged papyrus that recorded the names of Egyptian Gods, and the reigns of pharaohs from the First through the Seventeenth Dynasty of Egypt. Because of the extensive damage to the papyrus, while the section giving the length of his rule as being one year is preserved, the section of months and days is lost. He therefore would have ruled between 12 and 24 months. Nebdjefare is the seventh pharaoh of the ninth column on the Turin King List. Due to papyrus damage, his nomen has not survived.

References

Bibliography

17th-century BC Pharaohs
Pharaohs of the Fourteenth Dynasty of Egypt